Love Playlist is a South Korean web series. Spanning over four seasons, its episodes were released through PlayList Global's V Live, Naver TV Cast, YouTube, Facebook and Instagram official channels from March 9, 2017 to August 8, 2019. As of March 2020, the series has earned 630 million views.

Its television spin-off Dear. M is scheduled to air on KBS2 in 2021.

Synopsis
Love Playlist revolves around a group of college students as they learn about the joys and sorrows of relationships and breakups.

Main cast

Episodes

Series overview

Pilot (2017)

Season 1 (2017)

Season 2 (2017)

Season 3 (2018)

Season 4 (2019)

Original soundtrack

Season 2

Album

Bonus Track

Season 3

Part 1

Part 2

Season 4

Part 1

Part 2

Viewership
By the conclusion of the second season, the series had earned 100 million views.

The fourth season earned 30 million views after its last episode was released in the summer of 2019.

References

External links
  (season 4)

South Korean web series
2017 web series debuts
2019 web series endings
Naver TV original programming
Korean-language television shows
Playlist Studio original programming